Banks Creek is a rural locality split between the City of Brisbane and Somerset Region in Queensland, Australia. The locality is also split for the purposes of state and federal elections.

Geography

The locality takes its name from the creek of the same name which flows through the locality into the Brisbane River at Savages Crossing , where Banks Creek Road has a bridge over the Brisbane River. Banks Creek Road is the main route through the locality.

The Brisbane River forms the south-western boundary of the locality.

History
A sawmill was built in the district in 1911.

In 1927, flooding of the Brisbane River cut a deep channel in the river where Banks Creek Road crossed the river. A low-level bridge was built by Mr Davidson, junior, to enable traffic to cross.

In the 1930s, Banks Creek became known for its high-quality Cavendish bananas.

References

External links

Suburbs of the City of Brisbane
Suburbs of Somerset Region
Localities in Queensland